

See also
List of people from Alaska

References

Anchorage, Alaska
Anchorage
People from Anchorage, Alaska
Anchorage